Krisztián Pars (born 18 February 1982) is a Hungarian hammer thrower. He competed at the Summer Olympics in 2004, 2008, and 2012, winning the gold medal in 2012. He also won the 2012 and 2014 European championships.

Career
His personal best throw is 82.69 metres, achieved at the 2014 European Championships in Zürich. Pars previously held the world junior record (6 kg) with 81.35 metres, achieved in September 2001 in Szombathely. He took fourth place at the 2008 Beijing Olympics. He was initially upgraded to the silver medal after the doping disqualification of original medallists Vadim Devyatovskiy and Ivan Tsikhan in December 2008, but both had their medals reinstated two years later. That same year he won the silver medal in the hammer at the 2008 European Winter Throwing Cup meeting in Split and another silver at the 2008 IAAF World Athletics Final.

In the 2009 season, he began well with a victory at the 2009 European Winter Throwing Cup, but missed out on a major medal at the 2009 World Championships in Athletics with a fourth-place finish. He took the bronze at the 2009 IAAF World Athletics Final, the last year the competition was held.

He won the bronze medal at the 2010 European Athletics Championships, his first medal of the championships. At the end of the year he took part in the Pál Németh Memorial (a meeting in honour of his mentor Pál Németh), winning his second title of the competition with a throw of 78.34 metres. At the 2012 London Olympics he took the gold in the hammer throw with a winning toss of 80.59 m.

On 10 April 2018, he was banned until July 2019 because of a doping violation. He apologized to everybody for making a bad decision in a hard situation at a birthday party, as he tried something he had never before while being drunk. Later, based on public information from the AIU (Athletics Integrity Unit), it was revealed that cocaine was found in his blood.

Achievements

Awards
 Hungarian youth athlete of the year (1): 1999
 Hungarian junior athlete of the year (1): 2001, 2002
  Cross of Merit of the Republic of Hungary – Bronze Cross (2004)
 Hungarian athlete of the Year (8): 2007, 2008, 2009, 2011, 2012, 2013, 2014, 2015
 Person of the year in Vas County (2008)
  Order of Merit of the Republic of Hungary – Knight's Cross (2008)
 For Homeland honour (2012)
 Honorary Citizen of Szentgotthárd (2012)
  Order of Merit of Hungary – Officer's Cross (2012)

References

External links
 
 
 
 
 
 
 

1982 births
Living people
Hungarian male hammer throwers
Athletes (track and field) at the 2004 Summer Olympics
Athletes (track and field) at the 2008 Summer Olympics
Athletes (track and field) at the 2012 Summer Olympics
Athletes (track and field) at the 2016 Summer Olympics
Olympic athletes of Hungary
Olympic gold medalists for Hungary
World Athletics Championships medalists
European Athletics Championships medalists
Medalists at the 2012 Summer Olympics
World Athletics Championships athletes for Hungary
Olympic gold medalists in athletics (track and field)
Hungarian sportspeople in doping cases
Doping cases in athletics
IAAF Continental Cup winners
People from Körmend
Sportspeople from Vas County